Drevant is a commune in the Cher department in the Centre-Val de Loire region of France.

Geography

Population

Sights
 The church of St. Pierre, dating from the twelfth century.
 The chapel of the eleventh-century priory.
 Considerable Gallo-Roman remains, including an amphitheatre, baths, villas and an aqueduct.

See also
Communes of the Cher department

References

Communes of Cher (department)